Jonathan Yates is an American conductor of the Sarah Lawrence College, Yo-Yo Ma's Silk Road Ensemble and a recipient of both Walter F. Naumburg's Chamber Music Prize and American Society of Composers, Authors and Publishers award.

Early life and education
Yates have obtained a diploma through Juilliard School where he was taught by James DePreist and Otto-Werner Mueller. Later on, he got a scholarship which was named after Bruno Walter and then got his master's degree in music from State University of New York at Stony Brook after he completed his studies which were under guidance from Gilbert Kalish. Following that, he also obtained Bachelor of Arts degree from Harvard University where he was under guidance from Robert D. Levin.

Career
Yates is known for being a conductor of Michael Webster's Hell which he performed at Performance Space 122 and then did both Orfeo ed Euridice and Paride ed Elena of Christoph Willibald Gluck at the California Music Festival. He also conducted Adam Silverman's Orphans at the Austrian Cultural Forum and made his first public appearance at the age of 23 with National Symphony Orchestra at the Millennium Stage. A year later he performed at the Isaac Stern Chamber Music Workshop and then became a chamber orchestra musician at Miller Theater, Bargemusic, Merkin Hall and both Caramoor and Ravinia Festivals.

Besides the national performances, Yates also conducted in North America, Europe and Asia and was a soloist at the La Jolla Music Society and the National Museum of American History. He also conducted works at national universities such as the Chicago Youth Symphony, an orchestra from University of Chicago and Bach Society Orchestra of Harvard University.

Currently Yates works as a teacher of French, German and Italian languages and as an accompanist at the Lyric Opera Center for American Artists.

References

External links
 Jonathan Yates at Norwalk Youth Symphony

Living people
American male conductors (music)
Juilliard School alumni
Harvard University alumni
Stony Brook University alumni
Year of birth missing (living people)
21st-century American conductors (music)
21st-century American male musicians